Mount Laila, Lahili, Lailchala but also known as Lahla, is the highest peak of the Svaneti Range in Georgia. Lahili's geological makeup mostly consists of Upper Palaeozoic-Triassic quartzite, metamorphic rock and sandstone. The mountain is covered by snow and ice.

References

Further reading
 Friedrich Bender, 1992: Classic Climbs in the Caucasus: 80 Selected Climbs in the Elbrus and Bezingi Regions of the Svanetian Range. Diadem Books

External links
Alexclimb.com - Layla
SummitPost.org - Mount Layla

Laila, Mount